Rashad Karimov (born 2 April 1986) is an Azerbaijani footballer who last played for Sumgayit in the Azerbaijan Premier League.

Karimov scored the winning goal for Khazar Lankaran in the 2006–07 Azerbaijan Cup final against MKT Araz, netting in the 90th minute.

Career statistics

Honours
 Inter Baku
Azerbaijan Premier League
Winner (1): 2006–07
Azerbaijan Cup
Winner (2): 2006–07, 2007–08

References

External links

 

1986 births
Living people
Azerbaijani footballers
Khazar Lankaran FK players
Association football midfielders
Azerbaijan international footballers
FK Genclerbirliyi Sumqayit players